The Legend of Crazy Monk is a Chinese television series about the life of Ji Gong. The series was directed by Lin Tianyi and based on Guo Xiaoting's classical novel Biography of Ji Gong. It was a hot TV series recently in Guangdong Television, Jiangsu Television and Shenzhen Television. It is shown on Mediacorp Channel 8 at 7pm.

Cast 
 Benny Chan as Ji Gong
 Lam Chi-chung as Guang Liang
 Chen Zihan as Yan Zhi
 Lin Jiangguo as Zhao Bin
 Xinzi as Bai Xue
 Yang Xue as Bai Ling
 Lou Yajiang as Hei Feng
 Zhang Liang as Chen Liang
 Ye Zuxin as Bi Qing
 Zhang Maojiong as monk Yuan Kong

Others

Season I

Story 1
 Candy Tu as Hong Xiuying
 Wang Kuirong as Qin Xiang

Story 2
 Dong Xuan as Ming Zhu
 Yan Kuan as Sheng De
 Lou Yujian as Zhang Tianyuan

Story 3
 Zheng Yitong as Hua Niang
 Chi Shuai as Cui Junsheng
Zhang Meng as Xin Lan
 Zhang Lan as Mother Cui

Story 4
 Lin Linlin as Mother Ghost

Story 5
 Li Li as Zhou Wencong
 Ya Qi as Ru Ping
 Wang Gang as Businessman Zhou

Story 6
 Li Jialin as Xu Yulian
 Gao Ziqi as Dong Zhongqing
 Wu Jing as Mother Dong
 Li Zhinan as Xu Yulong

Story 7
 He Minghan as Xu Zijing
 Zhang Gong as Garuda

Season II

Story 1
 Timmy Hung as Xiao Yao
 Mu Tingting as Bing Lengxin
 Deng Tianqing as Leng Huazhi

Story 2
 Tao Huimin as Shao Fang
 Yue Yueli as Liang Hua/ Liang Bao
 Shi An as Lu Bang

Story 3
 Du Xiaoting as Jiang Yuefeng
 Cui Lin as Lu Tianyu
 Yao Yichen as Yu Wulang

Story 4
 Xu Xiyan as Li Menglan
 Chen Yizhen as Wawa

Story 5
 Shirley Dai as Li Chunhe
 Deng Ziyi as Shang Yun
 Du Junze as Wen Zheng
 Suen Yiu Wai as Hong Chengzong

Story 6
 Chunyu Shanshan as Liu Haotian
 Wang Xuanyu as Yelin
 Chen Jiajia as Zhu'er

Story 7
 Wang Jiayin as Zhao Yuzhen
 Huang Mingsheng as Zhu Minghan
 Li Chenxi as Shi Xiuyun

Story 8
 Yvonne Yung as Yu Linglong
 Victor Chen Sze Hon as Gao Feng

Story 9
Kong Lin as Tong Yu Xia
 Jian Yuanxin as Xia Ziyuan

Season 3

Story 1
 Fann Wong as Xue Rou
 Han Xiao as Xue Yan
 Zhou Zhong as Prince of the Devils

Story 2
 Liu Yajin as Bi Pan'an
 He Jiayi as Zhuang Hongxing
 Timmy Hung as Ao Zilong
 Zhou Zhixi as Qiu Tian'e
 Zhou Yunshen as Bi Panjin
 Dai Zixiang as Ye Qing
 Ye Ke'er as Yin Huan
 Wang Chunmei as Mother Zhuang
 Xue Shujie as Mother Bi
 Zheng Yanqi as Fang Hong
 Liu Xingling as Xiao Hongxing
 Wang Jiahui as Xiao Tian'e

Story 3
 Bi Chang as Lin Honghua
 Jian Yuanxin as The Emperor of Song Dynasty
 Zhang Yongqi as Lin Xiuyun
 Zhang Mingming as Wu Tianliang
 Li Dongheng as Du Xian
 Li Qingning as Du Ying
 Fang Zhoubo as Wu Hou
 Hu Zhonghu as Wu Jin
 Xu Bao as Fang Bicheng
 Jin Youming as Father Lin
 Shi Xiaoju as Mother Lin

Story 4
 Yang Xue as Bai Ling
 Zhang Liang as Qian Kun Dong Zhu

Story 5
 Wang Xiaoli as Ou Qingshan
 Li Jinrong as Kong Yulin
 Zheng Pengfei as Xie Jie
 Xiao Guangxu as Zuo Shan
 Liu Yuting as Luo Qiujuan  
 Qi Qinglin as Kong Duan
 Yuan Min as Businessman Qian

Story 6
 Candy Tu as Song Wanyi
 Gao Ren as A Lang
 Bao Wenjing as Xiaocui
 An Limin as Song Ke
 Xu Ming as Laoge

Story 7
 Yao Yichen as Luo Mi'ou
 Qiao Qiao as Zhu Liyue
 Tang Yuan as Tang Yuan
 Zhu Weiying as Mother Luo
 Chen Liangping as Father Zhu
 Li Yiru as Qingqing
 Yan Hongding as Tudou

Story 8
 Zhai Xingyue as Li Xingyue
 Shawn Wei as Li Menglong
 Mao Jianping as Mother Li
Zhang Zhixi as Chou Tianhe

Critical reception 
The television series earned critical acclaim.

See also
 Ji Gong, the main character in the series.
 Other media about Ji Gong:
 Ji Gong (TV series), a 1985 Chinese television series starring You Benchang and Lü Liang
 The Mad Monk, a 1993 Hong Kong film starring Stephen Chow
 The Legends of Jigong, a 1997 Singaporean television series starring Xie Shaoguang

References

External links

2010 Chinese television series debuts
Television series set in the Southern Song
Television shows based on Chinese novels
2011 Chinese television series endings
Guangdong Television original programming
Shenmo television series